The Hunter 30-2 is an American sailboat, that was built by Hunter Marine in the United States between 1988 and 1992.

The boat was sold under the name Hunter 30, but because the company has sold four designs under that name, this design has become known as the 30-2 to differentiate it.

Production
The design was built by Hunter Marine in the United States between 1988 and 1992.

Design

The Hunter 30-2 is a small recreational keelboat, built predominantly of fiberglass. It has a fractional sloop rig, a slightly raked stem, a walk-through reverse transom, an internally-mounted spade-type rudder controlled by a wheel and a fixed wing keel. It displaces  and carries  of ballast.

The boat is fitted with an inboard engine.

The design was factory delivered with a shower and hot water tank, double sinks, oven and stove top, and an icebox, as standard equipment.

The design has a PHRF racing average handicap of 183 with a high of 191 and low of 174.

See also

List of sailing boat types

Related development
Hunter 30
Hunter 30T

Similar sailboats
Alberg 30
Alberg Odyssey 30
Aloha 30
Annie 30
Bahama 30
Bristol 29.9
C&C 1/2 Ton
C&C 30
C&C 30 Redwing
Catalina 30
Catalina 309
CS 30
Grampian 30
Hunter 29.5
Hunter 306
J/30
Kirby 30
Leigh 30
Mirage 30
Mirage 30 SX
Nonsuch 30
Pearson 303
S2 9.2
Santana 30/30
Seafarer 30

References

External links

Official sales brochure

Keelboats
1980s sailboat type designs
Sailing yachts
Sailboat types built by Hunter Marine